Patrick Power (19 November 1928 – 14 August 2013) was an Irish Fianna Fáil politician.

A national schoolteacher before entering politics, he was first elected to Dáil Éireann as a Fianna Fáil Teachta Dála (TD) for the Kildare constituency at the 1969 general election.

He served as Minister for Fisheries and Forestry from 1979 to June 1981 and Minister for Defence in the government of March to December 1982. He was briefly Minister for Trade, Commerce and Tourism in October 1982 following the resignation of Desmond O'Malley to challenge for the leadership of the party. He was also a Member of the European Parliament (MEP) from 1977 to 1979.

His son, Seán Power is a former TD and Minister of State. Another son, J. J. Power, served as a Green Party councillor on Kildare County Council. 

Power retired from politics at the 1989 general election. He died on 14 August 2013 in Caragh, County Kildare. He had no connection with the Irish bookmakers of the same name.

See also
Families in the Oireachtas

References

 

1928 births
2013 deaths
Fianna Fáil MEPs
Fianna Fáil TDs
Irish schoolteachers
Members of the 19th Dáil
Members of the 20th Dáil
Members of the 21st Dáil
Members of the 22nd Dáil
Members of the 23rd Dáil
Members of the 24th Dáil
Members of the 25th Dáil
MEPs for the Republic of Ireland 1977–1979
Ministers for Defence (Ireland)
People from Naas
Local councillors in County Kildare
Ministers for Enterprise, Trade and Employment